Sings a String of Harold Arlen is a 1961 studio album by Tony Bennett. It consists of string arrangements of songs composed by Harold Arlen. The illustration on the cover is by Bob Peak.

Track listing
All music composed by Harold Arlen, lyricists indicated.

 "When the Sun Comes Out" (Ted Koehler) – 2:44
 "Over the Rainbow" (Yip Harburg) – 4:02
 "House of Flowers" (Truman Capote) – 3:35
 "Come Rain or Come Shine" (Johnny Mercer) – 3:34
 "For Every Man There's a Woman" (Leo Robin) – 3:16
 "Let's Fall in Love" (Koehler) – 4:35
 "Right as the Rain" (Harburg) – 3:30
 "It Was Written in the Stars" (Robin) – 2:56
 "What Good Does It Do" (Harburg) – 4:10
 "Fun to Be Fooled" (Ira Gershwin, Harburg) – 3:50
 "This Time the Dream's on Me" (Mercer) – 3:11
 "I've Got the World on a String" (Koehler) – 4:37

Recorded on August 15 (#2-4, 6), August 17 (#1, 5, 7-8, 12) and August 18 (#9-11), 1960.

Personnel
 Tony Bennett – vocals
 Glenn Osser – arranger, conductor

References

1960 albums
Tony Bennett albums
Columbia Records albums
Harold Arlen tribute albums
Albums recorded at CBS 30th Street Studio
Albums arranged by Glenn Osser
Albums conducted by Glenn Osser